The Pigou Club is described by its creator, economist Gregory Mankiw, as a “group of economists and pundits with the good sense to have publicly advocated higher Pigovian taxes, such as gasoline taxes or carbon taxes." A Pigovian tax (also spelled Pigouvian tax, named after economist Arthur Cecil Pigou) is a tax levied to correct the negative externalities (negative side-effects) of a market activity. These ideas are also known as an ecotaxes or green tax shifts.

Members

Supports 

The Economist has expressed support for Pigouvian policies as has The Washington Post Editorial Board, NPR's "Planet Money" and The New York Times.

References

External links
  The Pigou Club Manifesto (Greg Mankiw's Blog)
  Smart Taxes: An Open Invitation to Join the Pigou Club
  Rogoff joins the Pigou Club (Greg Mankiw's Blog)
 Raise the Gasoline Tax? Funny, It Doesn’t Sound Republican (New York Times)
 Talk of Raising Gas Tax Is Just That (Washington Post)
  The Nopigou Club (National Post)
 How Many Taxes Will it Take? (National Post)

Economic policy
Environmental tax
Environmental economics